Fameless is an American prank show hosted by David Spade that aired on TruTV for two seasons from 2015 to 2017. The original order was for eight episodes, with an additional ten added to fill out the first season, having received better-than-network-average ratings during its 2015 summer run.

Each week, the series features a group of unsuspecting desperate-to-be-famous individuals who believe they've been cast on a reality show. However, unbeknownst to them, they are really filming a parody with improv actors creating over-the-top scenarios that steadily increase the absurdity and ridiculousness of each situation

Episodes

Season 1 (2015-16)

Season 2 (2016–17)

References

External links 
 

2010s American reality television series
2015 American television series debuts
2017 American television series endings